The sparsetooth dogfish (Scymnodalatias oligodon) is a very rare sleeper shark of the family Somniosidae, the holotype of which was taken in the subtropical southeast Pacific at a depth of up to 200 m.  Its biology is unknown.

References

 

Scymnodalatias
Fish described in 1988